Ian Gordon (born 11 February 1933) is a former Australian rules footballer who played with St Kilda in the Victorian Football League (VFL).

A half back flanker, Gordon started his career playing for Golden Point in the Ballarat Football League. He joined St Kilda in 1956 but didn't debut until the 1957 VFL season, when he appeared in St Kilda's round two loss to Footscray at Western Oval. It would be his only senior game for St Kilda.

Gordon then played with Port Melbourne in 1958. He returned to Golden Point in 1959 and won that year's Henderson Medal.

References

1933 births
Australian rules footballers from Victoria (Australia)
St Kilda Football Club players
Port Melbourne Football Club players
Golden Point Football Club players
Living people